At-Targhib wat-Tarhib or Targhib wal Tarhib, is one of the Hadith books compiled by Hafiz Zaki-ud-deen Abdul Azeem Al Munzari (d.656 AH) in the 7th century of Islamic History.

Etymology

The term "targhib" means "reward", "inducement", "seducing" or "luring", and the term "terhib" means "terror". Thus the Quranic concept of "Targhib wal Tarhib" means "reward and terror".

Description

The book contains almost one thousand hadiths according to Maktaba Shamila. The author of the book basically compiled those Hadiths which are dealing with dos and don'ts from Islamic perspective.

Publications
The book has been published by many organizations around the world: 

At-Targhib Wat Tarhib: Arabic Only Min al Hadith Al Sharif: Published:  Dar Al Kotob Al-Ilmiyah (DKI), Beirut, Lebanon (2016) 
At Targhib wat Tarhib 4 Vols (Arabic) by Hafiz Abu Bakr Ahmed al-Bazzar: Published:Maktaba Rasheedia Queeta

Manuscripts
One notable manuscript of the saying was copied by Amina, bint al-Hajj ʿAbd al-Latif, a Moroccan woman who was a jurist and scribe, and is dated to 1802.

See also

 List of Sunni books
 Kutub al-Sittah
 Sahih Muslim
 Jami al-Tirmidhi
 Sunan Abu Dawood
 Jami' at-Tirmidhi
 Either: Sunan ibn Majah, Muwatta Malik

References

9th-century Arabic books
10th-century Arabic books
Sunni literature
Hadith
Hadith collections
Sunni hadith collections